Guns of a Stranger is a 1973 American Western film directed by Robert Hinkle and written by Charles W. Aldridge. The film stars Marty Robbins, Chill Wills, Dovie Beams, Steven Tackett, Bill Coontz and Shug Fisher. The film was released on May 1, 1973, by Universal Pictures.

Plot

Marty Robbins plays a sheriff who is attacked by a young gunfighter. After he kills the gunfighter in self defense, he quits being a lawman and becomes a singing drifter. Marty drifts into a war between honest folks and a gang of crooks.  Note:Ronny Robbins is Marty's real life son.

Cast 
Marty Robbins as Sheriff Matthew Roberts
Chill Wills as Tom Duncan
Dovie Beams as Virginia Duncan
Steven Tackett as Danny Duncan
Bill Coontz as Ace Gorenum 
Shug Fisher as Shug Meadows
Tom Hartman as Harley Rutledge
Charles W. Aldridge as Clyde Terlan
Ronny Robbins as Alfred Bearden
Melody Hinkle as Faye Bearden
Mark Reed as Young Outlaw
Don Winters as Axe Mayhew
Bobby Sykes as Bob Bishop
Fred Graham as Sheriff Stoner
Phil Strassberg as Nathan Cryder
Al Wood as Fight Promoter
Harold Wells as Tiger Wells
Jack Swank as Bartender
Du Shon as Blackie
Glenn Bond as Stagecoach Guard 
Jim Mooney as Deputy
Jenny Needham as Sadie Ketcham
Nudie as Blacksmith
Ron Nix as Indian

References

External links
 

1973 films
American Western (genre) films
1973 Western (genre) films
Universal Pictures films
1970s English-language films
1970s American films